Clubsound are a showband from Northern Ireland. Formed in 1970, the band enjoyed particular success during the 1970s and 1980s. The original line-up featured George Jones, Tommy Thomas who wrote much of the comedy material, Dave McKnight, Barry Woods and Alan McCartney.

They started in 1955 as a seven-piece skiffle band called Danie Sands and the Javelins. The band later did backing singing before evolving into a comedy cabaret act. Clubsound enjoyed several locally successful singles, including Belfast, Belfast and Shankill Airways.

Members
The original lineup featured drummer Bryan "Tommy" Thomas from Wales (died c. 22 April 2022), bassist George Jones, Barry Woods, Alan McCartney and Dave McKnight. The later lineup featured Jones, Woods, McCartney, McKnight, Jimmy Black and Harry Hickland.

Early practice sessions would take place outside Jones' house. Van Morrison, then a part-time saxophone player, would often join these sessions. Indeed, a band called The Monarchs was formed prior to Clubsound that included Morrison. After the Monarchs disbanded, and Morrison went on to lead the band Them, the other members of the Monarchs formed Clubsound.

The band got its name from a suggestion made by Dermot O'Donnell, manager of the Abercorn Bar in Belfast. The Abercorn Cabaret Club was to become the band's residency for three years.

Reunions
Though no longer a permanent band, Clubsound have had intermittent reunion tours, sometimes writing new material.

References

Musical groups from Northern Ireland